Hazarmaveth (Ḥăṣarmāweṯ) is the third of thirteen sons of Joktan, who was a son of Eber, son of Shem in the table of the Sons of Noah in Genesis chapter 10 and 1 Chronicles chapter 1 in the Bible. This Table of Nations lists purported founders of neighboring ethnic groups or nations.  

Genesis 10:26  "...And Joktan hath begotten Almodad, and Sheleph, and Hazarmaveth, and Jerah..."

Hazarmaveth, also transcribed Hazarmaueth, means "dwelling of death" (Hitchcock's Bible Dictionary) and is composed of two parts in Hebrew: hazar/ḥaṣar ("dwelling" or "court") and maveth/mawet ("death"). (There are alternative systems for transliterating Hebrew into Latin letters.) In the Ethiopic version, the name is Hasremot. 

Scholars of Semitic languages have related the name to the ancient region of Hadhramaut in the modern Southern Arabian nation of Yemen, and indeed, one of the other sons of Joktan is Sheba, the name of an ancient Southern Arabian kingdom. 

Book of Genesis people
Books of Chronicles people